Hōri Kīngi Te Ānaua (died 18 September 1868) was a leader of Ngāti Ruaka, a subtribe of Te Āti Haunui-a-Pāpārangi iwi (Māori tribe) of New Zealand in the early and mid 19th century. He was a leader of the tribes of the Wanganui River district in the tribal wars of the early 19th century. Rere-ō-maki, mother of military leader Te Keepa Te Rangihiwinui (Major Kemp), was his sister.

References

1868 deaths
Te Āti Haunui-a-Pāpārangi people
Signatories of the Treaty of Waitangi
Year of birth missing